In mathematics, a function is said to vanish at infinity if its values approach 0 as the input grows without bounds. There are two different ways to define this with one definition applying to functions defined on normed vector spaces and the other applying to functions defined on locally compact spaces. 
Aside from this difference, both of these notions correspond to the intuitive notion of adding a point at infinity, and requiring the values of the function to get arbitrarily close to zero as one approaches it. This definition can be formalized in many cases by adding an (actual) point at infinity.

Definitions 

A function on a normed vector space is said to  if the function approaches  as the input grows without bounds (that is,  as ). Or,

in the specific case of functions on the real line.

For example, the function 
 

defined on the real line vanishes at infinity.

Alternatively, a function  on a locally compact space , if given any positive number , there exists a compact subset  such that 

whenever the point  lies outside of  In other words, for each positive number  the set  has compact closure. 
For a given locally compact space  the set of such functions

As an example, the function

A normed space is locally compact if and only if it is finite-dimensional so in this particular case, there are two different definitions of a function "vanishing at infinity". 
The two definitions could be inconsistent with each other: if  in an infinite dimensional Banach space, then  vanishes at infinity by the  definition, but not by the compact set definition.

Rapidly decreasing 

One of the basic intuitions of mathematical analysis is that the Fourier transform interchanges smoothness conditions with rate conditions on vanishing at infinity. The  test functions of tempered distribution theory are smooth functions that are 

This condition is set up so as to be self-dual under Fourier transform, so that the corresponding distribution theory of  will have the same property.

See also

Citations

References 

 

Mathematical analysis